William Victor Stone Ling (3 October 1891 – 26 September 1960) was a South African cricketer who played in six Test matches from 1921 to 1923.

A middle-order batsman and leg-spinbowler, Ling played first-class cricket for Griqualand West from 1911 to 1930, except for a season with Eastern Province in 1928–29.

References

External links

1891 births
1960 deaths
South Africa Test cricketers
South African cricketers
Eastern Province cricketers
Griqualand West cricketers